Peg wooden dolls, also known as Dutch dolls, are a type of wooden doll from Germany. They originated as simple lathe-turned dolls from the Val Gardena in the Alps. The name Pennywoods is also used for dolls of this type, in particular those made in the United States. These dolls were sold undressed. Children would then make their clothing from scraps of fabric.

Other similarly-constructed wooden dolls, using a jointing technique where the arms and/or legs are attached to the body with pegs, are some of the oldest surviving dolls, and were made worldwide. Sometimes a peg wooden doll's arms or legs are locked together by the jointing system, so if one arm is moved the other will move. An advanced form of peg joints is where the body pegs are "split" and attached separately allowing independent movement.

Tuck comb dolls are a special style of peg wooden doll, named for their carved hair comb. The head and body are turned as one piece. The hair is usually painted with curled fringes and with a painted comb. Early tuck comb dolls had elongated, graceful proportions, nicely carved details, painted slippers, and sometimes with wood pendant earrings. Some dressed as merchants were called pedlar dolls.

Gallery

In culture 
In 1895 Florence Kate Upton illustrated a children's book entitled The Adventures of Two Dutch Dolls and a Golliwogg.

Hitty, Her First Hundred Years is an American children's novel about a carved wooden doll written by Rachel Field published in 1929. 

Tottie: The Story of a Doll's House is based on the book The Doll's House, by Rumer Godden, which features a small peg doll as its main character.

Night Terrors (Doctor Who) features life-sized peg dolls as monsters

See also 
 Museum Gherdëina - has a collection of Dutch dolls of different sizes.
 Penny doll - inexpensive china or bisque doll
 Penny toy - inexpensive tin toys

References 

Traditional dolls
Wooden dolls